Teddybears (formerly Teddybears STHLM) are a Swedish alternative rock band formed in 1991, known for mixing pop, rock, hip hop, electronica, reggae, punk, and many other genres.

History
Teddybears began as a grindcore group called Skull. As for the name Teddybears, Joakim Åhlund says, "If you're familiar with the Swedish or Norwegian black metal scene, you know back then every band was called things like 'Corpse Grinder From Hell'. So we called ourselves the Teddybears as an 'anti' thing. We were the hardest rocking [band] in Sweden and we're calling ourselves the Teddybears." The band members started to wear large bear masks in album art and promotional photographs sometime after 2006; before that, they appeared in concert and on photos without disguises. The band initially consisted of Patrik Arve and brothers Joakim and Klas Åhlund, before drummer Olsson joined them. They released their debut album You Are Teddybears in 1993, and their second album, titled I Can't Believe It's Teddybears STHLM followed in 1996. Their third album Rock 'n' Roll Highschool came out in 2000 and consisted of electronic elements, which were a departure from the band's previous hardcore sound. A fourth album, Fresh, was released in 2005 and included the singles "Cobrastyle" and "Hey Boy".

Joakim Åhlund is also the lead guitarist and songwriter for the band Caesars, who are best known for their hit single "Jerk It Out". Klas Åhlund has produced most of the Caesars' albums and also produced Robyn's 2005 self-titled album. The two brothers also direct television adverts and music videos.

Their song "Cobrastyle" is featured on the soundtrack of the FIFA 06, FIFA 23, and Forza Motorsport 2 video games. It was also used in the ending credits of the film Employee of the Month and WWE's Summerslam 2006 as the official theme song for the event. It was featured prominently in the pilot episode of NBC's 2007 comedy show Chuck as well. A part from their song "Move Over", from the album Rock 'n' Roll Highschool, was used in the 2004 video game Driv3r as the main menu music. In a recent commercial, Intel had used a sample of the band's song "Different Sound", to promote their new Intel Core 2 Duo processor. In 2009, Telus used the track "Ahead of My Time" in their 'Downtime' TV advertisement. Their song "Devil's Music" was featured in the 2010 video game Need for Speed: Hot Pursuit. Their song "Next to You" an early version of the song, "Get Fresh With You" without vocalist Laza Morgan was featured on the soundtrack for NBA Live 09.

Their song "Different Sound" was featured on the soundtrack album for the Hugh Grant film Music and Lyrics, as well as on Numb3rs''' Season 3 Episode 4, "The Mole". They also made a remix of "Stayin' Alive" by the Bee Gees which was featured on the 2007 album, Bee Gees Greatest (Special Edition).

The group has a global music publishing deal with BMG Music Publishing. They have signed to Atlantic Records and Big Beat/Atlantic Records released their first North American album, Soft Machine on 12 September 2006, under the shortened moniker Teddybears. The album includes appearances from Iggy Pop, Annie, Ebbot Lundberg of The Soundtrack of Our Lives, Mad Cobra, Elephant Man, and Neneh Cherry.

In an interview with Scandinavian news agency TT Spectra, Joakim Åhlund states that he is working on a new Teddybears album. Two tracks are already recorded with rapper Slick Rick and Flaming Lips frontman Wayne Coyne.

In an August 2009 interview with Swedish newspaper Expressen Joakim Åhlund stated that the new album would be released during the fall and that it would feature a song with Swingfly and Coco Sumner, the daughter of Sting. He explained that the album would be a party album but one track would be more political and criticize the American religious right.

In the summer of 2009, they released the track "Get Mama a House" as part of the advertising campaign for a Swedish real estate company. The album Devil's Music was released on 24 March 2010.

A version of the song "Rocket Scientist" from the album "Devil's Music" was featured on Breaking Bad Season 3 Episode 5.

On 16 May 2014, the band exclusively regrouped for Vans's sponsor party in the upcoming neighborhood of Kungsholmen in Stockholm. The band played "Ahead of My Time" and "Punkrocker" while distributing Vans shoes and socks to the audience.

In September 2018, Teddybears played a hometown show with Rodrigo "Rodde" Pencheff from Infinite Mass and Latin Kings as guest, closing the 2018 concert season at amusement park Gröna Lund.

Members
 Patrik Arve – vocals, synthesizer, vocoder, bass, programming, percussion, keyboards
 Joakim Åhlund – bass guitar, programming, percussion, keyboards, backing vocals, guitar
 Klas Åhlund – guitar, bass, programming, percussion, keyboards, backing vocals

Former members
 Erik Olsson – drums, vibraphone
 Glenn Sundell – drums

Discography
Albums

EPsWomen in Pain (1991)Extra Pleasure (1993)Step on It (We Are The Best!) (German release only) (1994)No More Michael Jackson (2011)

Singles
"Purple Rain" (1995)
"Magic Finger" (1996)
"Kanzi" (1996)
"Ahead of My Time" featuring Daddy Boastin' (1999)
"Yours to Keep" featuring Paola (2000)
"Automatic Lover" (2000)
"Hiphopper" featuring Thomas Rusiak (2000)
"Rock 'n' Roll Highschool" featuring Thomas Rusiak (2000)
"Cobrastyle" featuring Mad Cobra (2004, US release: 2006)
"Hey Boy" featuring Swing-Fly (2004)
"Little Stereo" featuring Daddy Boastin' (2005)
“Young, handsome, & fast” featuring Rigo and Rakel (2019)
"Punkrocker" featuring Iggy Pop (2006)
"Yours to Keep" featuring Neneh Cherry (2006)
"Get Mama A House" featuring B.o.B. (2009)
"Rocket Scientist" featuring Eve (2010)
"No More Michael Jackson" (2011)
"Zero Gravity" (2011)
"Sunshine" featuring Malte Holmberg & Natalie Storm (2014)
"Shimmy Shimmy Style" (2014, re-released 2018 ft. Petite Meller)
"What's Your Problem?" featuring Baby Trish (2015)
"Broken Heartbeat" featuring Beenie Man (2015)

Guests
Thomas Rusiak – Magic Villa (2000), appears on "Hiphopper" & "STHLM's Finest"
Daddy Boastin' – Efterlyst (2002), co-writers & producers of 4 tracks
Robyn – The Rakamonie EP (2006), co-writers & producers of "Cobrastyle"
Robyn – Robyn (2007, international edition), co-writers & producers of "Cobrastyle"

Appearances
"Different Sound (feat. Malte)" has been used in the following places:
 On the Sci Fi series 'The Lost Room' episode "The Comb"
 On episode 14 "Starlet Fever" of CBS' Shark On an Intel Core Duo TV advertisement
 In the 2007 romantic comedy Music and Lyrics On episode 41 "The Mole" of Numb3rs On episode 4.11 ("Everything In Its Right Place") of One Tree Hill In the 2007 movie Mad Money starring Diane Keaton, Queen Latifah, and Katie Holmes
"Move Over" has been used in:
 The soundtrack of the 2004 video game Driv3r.
 Xbox Live's Major Nelson weekly Blogcast
"Ahead Of My Time (feat. Daddy Boastin')" has been used in:
 The movie The Air I Breathe (2007)
 A series of Telus commercials, Canada-Wide, spring 2009
 The TV series Life season 1 episode 11 (2007)
 Axe Dandruff commercial has "Hey Boy" playing in the club
 "Rocket Scientist" has been used in:
 The opening scenes of episode "Moving the Chains" of House The 5th episode of the 3rd season of Breaking Bad during the strip club scene
 The 1st episode "A New Day" of the 3rd season of The Good Wife The trailer for the movie Seven Psychopaths. "Cobrastyle" has been used in:
 The trailer for the movie Epic Movie The trailer for the movie Paul The 2006 film Employee of the Month The pilot episodes of Chuck and Grey's Anatomy The pilot episode of the first season of Teen Wolf The 2006 film "The Benchwarmers"
 The 2010 film "Diary of a Wimpy Kid (film)"
 The thirteenth episode of the first season of 90210
 "Devil's Music" in Need for Speed: Hot Pursuit "Get Fresh With You" in the second episode of the fourth season of 90210
 "Sunshine" has been used in:
 The third official theme song of SummerSlam 2014.
 FIFA 15 Soundtrack featuring Natalie Storm 
 The 2015 Peugeot 208 European commercial
 Pitch Perfect 2 soundtrack
 The Royal Caribbean sponsorship idents for The Masked Singer UKRemixes
 Lisa Miskovsky — Still Alive (Teddybears Remix)
 Marilyn Manson — Arma-Goddamn-Motherfuckin-Geddon (Teddybears Remix) 
 Daft Punk — Adagio for TRON (Teddybears Remix)
 Bee Gees — Stayin' Alive'' (Teddybears Remix)

References

External links
[ Lars Lovén, AllMusic]
Facebook

Swedish rock music groups
Musical groups established in 1991
Atlantic Records artists
English-language singers from Sweden
Masked musicians
1991 establishments in Sweden